Spanley Rocks is a group of about six rocks standing 10 nautical miles (18 km) southwest of Cordiner Peaks, marking the northern extremity of Neptune Range, Pensacola Mountains. Mapped by United States Geological Survey (USGS) from surveys and U.S. Navy air photos, 1956–66. Named by Advisory Committee on Antarctic Names (US-ACAN) for John A. Spanley, Jr., cook at South Pole Station, winter 1965.

Rock formations of Queen Elizabeth Land